Martin Sarmiento Jumoad (born November 11, 1956, in Cebu City), is a prelate of the Roman Catholic Church in the Philippines.  He is the Archbishop of Ozamiz in Ozamiz City, Misamis Occidental, Philippines.

Early life and episcopacy

Martin S. Jumoad was born on November 11, 1956, in Kinasangan, Pardo, Cebu City. He was ordained a priest on April 7, 1983. Pope John Paul II appointed him Prelate of Isabela, Basilan on Nov. 21, 2001. His episcopal ordination as the Third Bishop-Prelate of Isabela (Basilan) was held on Jan. 10, 2002 and installed on Jan. 12, 2002.

As a priest he served the dioceses in various capacities.

He was Assistant Pastor of Isabela Cathedral (1983-1986), Pastor of the parish of St. Anthony in Lamitan (1986-1989), Assistant and later dean of the “Remase” seminarians in Davao (1990-1992), Pastor of the parish of St. Peter in Lamitan (1992-1994), Chancellor of the Prelature of Isabela (1998- 2001), Director of Claret College of Isabela (1999-2001) and Administrator of the Prelature of Isabela (2001). He speaks English, Tagalog, Bisaya and Chavacano.

Pope Francis named him Archbishop of Ozamiz October 2016, succeeding Msgr. Jesus Dosado.

At the time of appointment as Archbishop of Ozamiz he was member of national bishops’ conferences’ Commission on Migrants and Itinerant People (ECMI) and the Episcopal Commission on Mission (ECM).

References

External links

 Catholic Hierarchy
 G-Catholic

21st-century Roman Catholic archbishops in the Philippines
1956 births
Living people
People from Cebu
Visayan people
Roman Catholic archbishops of Ozamiz